Bécourt may refer to the following places in France:

 Bécourt, Pas-de-Calais, a commune in the Pas-de-Calais department
 Bécourt, a village in the Somme department destroyed in the First World War, now part of the commune of Bécordel-Bécourt